Village Health Organization, most commonly known as VHO, is a non-profit organization licensed as an NGO in Pakistan. The idea was initiated by Arz Mohammad Shaikh, a Pakistani professional engineer living in Abu Dhabi, United Arab Emirates.

To date, VHO has set up nearly 50 Clinics in Pakistan, India, Sri Lanka and the Sudan. The main objective of the clinics is to provide free diagnosis, treatment and medicines to the people of remote villages where there are absolutely no facilities for Health Care and travel to nearby towns is otherwise necessary to obtain the services of physicians.

External links
 VHO website

Medical and health organisations based in Pakistan